The 2019 Rally Finland (also known as Neste Rally Finland 2019) was a motor racing event for rally cars held over four days between 1 and 4 August 2019. It marked the sixty-ninth running of Rally Finland and was the ninth round of the 2019 World Rally Championship, World Rally Championship-2 and the newly-created WRC-2 Pro class. It was also the fourth round of the Junior World Rally Championship.

Ott Tänak and Martin Järveoja were the defending rally winners. Their team, Toyota Gazoo Racing WRT, were the defending manufacturers' winners. The local crew of Eerik Pietarinen and Juhana Raitanen were the defending winners in the World Rally Championship-2 category, but they did not defend their titles as they were promoted to the newly-created WRC-2 Pro class by Škoda Motorsport. The Estonian crew of Ken Torn and Kuldar Sikk were the reigning winners of the Junior World Rally Championship, but they did not compete the rally.

Tänak and Järveoja successfully defended their titles, adding their winning number to double figures. Their team, Toyota Gazoo Racing WRT, won the rally three years in a row. Local youngster Kalle Rovanperä and Jonne Halttunen took their fourth consecutive victory in the WRC-2 Pro category, finishing first in the combined WRC-2 category, while the Russian crew of Nikolay Gryazin and Yaroslav Fedorov won the wider WRC-2 class as well as snatching their first WRC point. Tom Kristensson and Henrik Appelskog took their second victory of the season in the junior category to regain the championship lead.

Background

Championship standings prior to the event
Ott Tänak and Martin Järveoja led both the drivers' and co-drivers' championships by three-points ahead of defending world champions Sébastien Ogier and Julien Ingrassia. Thierry Neuville and Nicolas Gilsoul were third, a further three points behind. In the World Rally Championship for Manufacturers, Hyundai Shell Mobis WRT held a forty-four-point lead over Toyota Gazoo Racing WRT.

In the World Rally Championship-2 Pro standings, Kalle Rovanperä and Jonne Halttunen held a thirteen-point lead ahead of Mads Østberg and Torstein Eriksen in the drivers' and co-drivers' standings respectively. Gus Greensmith and Elliott Edmondson were third, another thirteen points further back. In the manufacturers' championship, Škoda Motorsport and M-Sport Ford WRT tied with same points, with Citroën Total sixty-one points behind in third.

In the World Rally Championship-2 standings, Benito Guerra and Jaime Zapata led the drivers' and co-drivers' standings by eighteen points respectively. Pierre-Louis Loubet and Vincent Landais were second, following by Ole Christian Veiby and Jonas Andersson in third.

In the Junior-World Rally Championship standings, Jan Solans and Mauro Barreiro led Tom Kristensson and Henrik Appelskog by nine points in the drivers' and co-drivers' standings respectively, with Dennis Rådström and Johan Johansson six points further behind in third in their own standings. In the Nations' standings, Sweden were first, six points cleared of Spain, with Germany eighteen points further behind in third.

Entry list
The following crews entered into the rally. The event opened to crews competing in the World Rally Championship, World Rally Championship-2, WRC-2 Pro, Junior World Rally Championship and privateer entries not registered to score points in any championship. A total of sixty-five entries were received, with eleven crews entered with World Rally Cars and thirteen entered the World Rally Championship-2. Three crews were nominated to score points in the Pro class. A further fourteen entries were received for the Junior World Rally Championship.

Route
There were no significant changes to the route for the 2019 event outside some slight length reductions to selected stages.

Itinerary

All dates and times are EEST (UTC+3).

Report

World Rally Cars
Elfyn Evans and Scott Martin were entered by M-Sport Ford WRT, but were later withdrawn when Evans was injured contesting Rally Estonia as part of their pre-event preparations. Gus Greensmith and Elliott Edmondson were withdrawn from the WRC 2-Pro category and re-entered in Evans' and Martin's place. Hayden Paddon and John Kennard were entered into the rally by M-Sport Ford WRT, but they were withdrawn after a heavy crash during testing that caused irreparable damage their car.

It was a drama-free Friday for front runners, with Jari-Matti Latvala took a narrow lead into the second leg. However, the local Finn punctured his rear-left tyre in a right-hand corner, which dropped him down to third. Teammate Kris Meeke also ran into trouble at the same corner, but damage to the rear-left suspension forced the Northern Irishman retired from the day. Despite re-entering the rally on the final day, he still had to retire as he stopped again when he hit a rock. Gus Greensmith's rally ended his rally on SS20 after crashing into a tree.

The rally was easily won by Ott Tänak, who won his tenth rally in his WRC career as well as winning his 200th stage victory during the event.

Classification

Special stages

Championship standings

World Rally Championship-2 Pro
Defending WRC-2 winner Eerik Pietarinen crashed out at the very first of the day and was unable to continue. Kalle Rovanperä was comfortable in the lead and collected his fourth straight WRC-2 Pro victory.

Classification

Special stages
Results in bold denote first in the RC2 class, the class which both the WRC-2 Pro and WRC-2 championships run to.

Championship standings

World Rally Championship-2
Local driver Emil Lindholm led the category before he crashed out in the second stage. Pierre-Louis Loubet led the class until the last stage of leg two, when he misheard a pace note and smashed into a tree. Eventually, Nikolay Gryazin snatched his first victory of the class after a consistent weekend.

Classification

Special stages
Results in bold denote first in the RC2 class, the class which both the WRC-2 Pro and WRC-2 championships run to.

Championship standings

Junior World Rally Championship
Raul Badiu heavily crashed his Ford Fiesta R2, suffering two fractured ribs and a concussion. The Romanian was forced to retire from the rally and received medical treatment. Roland Poom and Jürgen Heigl was the two major retirements in the second leg. Dennis Rådström could have taken some good points from the event, but the crash in the penultimate stage means he was thirty-four points off the lead. Compatriot Tom Kristensson took the victory with eight stage victories to retake the championship lead.

Classification

Special stages

Championship standings

Notes

References

External links

  
 2019 Rally Finland in e-wrc website
 The official website of the World Rally Championship

Finland
2019 in Finnish sport
August 2019 sports events in Europe
2019